Sergei Vasilievich Makovetsky (born 13 June 1958) is a Soviet and Ukrainian-born Russian film and stage actor.

Filmography

Film

1982: To take live!
1983: Ekipazh mashiny boevoy - Grisha Chumak
1985: Polosa prepyatstviy - Lyokha
1986: Zaveshchanie - Aleksey Ugarov v molodosti
1988: Topinambury
1989: The Initiated - Liokha
1990: Chernov/Chernov
1991: Sons of Bitches - Borya Sinyukhaev
1992: Prorva - Vanya's Friend
1993: Rebyonok k noyabryu - Lyosha
1992: Patrioticheskaya komediya - Ilyin
1992: Nash amerikanskiy Borya
1993: Malenkie chelovechki Bolshevistskogo pereulka, ili Khochu piva
1993: Makarov - Aleksandr Sergeyevich Makarov
1994: Trotsky - Leon Trotsky

1994: Burnt by the Sun - Captain
1995: A Play for a Passenger - Oleg
1996: Operation Happy New Year 
1997: Three Stories - Tikhomirov
1998: Of Freaks and Men - Iogan
2000: Brother 2 - Valentin Belkin
2000: Russkiy Bunt - Alexey Shvabrin
2001: Mechanical Suite — Plyuganovskiy
2003: Key from the bedroom - Ivanickiy
2004: 72 Meters - Chernenko
2005: The Fall of the Empire - Nesterovsky
2005: Dead Man's Bluff - Koron
2006: It Doesn't Hurt Me - Doctor
2007: Gloss
2007: Roly-poly toy (film) - Semenych
2007: Duska - Duska
2007: Temptation
2007: Russian Game - Hvoshnev
2007: Luster
2007: 12 - 1st Juror
2008: I consider: one, two, three, four, five...
2009: The Priest - Alexander
2009: The Miracle
2010: Alice in Wonderland - The White Rabbit (Russian dubbing)
2010: Burnt by the Sun 2: Exodus - Captain
2011: Burnt by the Sun 2: Citadel - Captain
2012: The Girl and Death
2015: POETIC PORTRAITS AT GIFT FESTIVAL documentary film by shota kalandadze

Series
2002: Failure Poirot (TV)(Poirot's Misfortune - The Murder of Roger Ackroyd)
2007: Likvidatsya - Fima Petrov
2012: Life and Fate
2015: Rodina - Anna's boss
2020: The Terrible - Ivan the terrible

References

External links 

Russian male actors
Soviet male actors

Living people
1958 births
Russian male television actors
Russian male voice actors
State Prize of the Russian Federation laureates
Honored Artists of the Russian Federation
Actors from Kyiv
Recipients of the Nika Award
 Academicians of the National Academy of Motion Picture Arts and Sciences of Russia
Recipients of the Order "For Merit to the Fatherland", 4th class